Miklós Szakáts (30 April 1920 - 22 October 1984) was a Hungarian actor. He appeared in more than forty films from 1943 to 1969.

Selected filmography

References

External links 

1920 births
1984 deaths
Hungarian male film actors